Ascot Park can refer to:
 Ascot Park (speedway) – dirt racing track in Gardena, California
 Ascot Park, New Zealand – suburb in Porirua, New Zealand
 Ascot Park, South Australia – place in Adelaide, South Australia
 Ascot Park (race track) – a defunct horse racing facility in Akron, Ohio